Frank Aleamon Leach (August 19, 1846 – June 19, 1929) was a United States newspaperman who was Director of the United States Mint from 1906 to 1909. In the aftermath of the 1906 San Francisco earthquake, the heroic efforts by Frank A. Leach and his men preserved the old San Francisco Mint building and the bullion that then backed the nation's currency.

Biography

Frank A. Leach was born in Auburn, New York on August 19, 1846, the son of Edwin Warren Leach and his wife Mary A. Leach.  When he was a boy, his father moved to Sacramento, California to establish a bottling plant there, and Frank and his mother later joined his father there.  In 1857, the family moved to Napa, California.

In 1867, at age 20, Leach became a newspaper publisher when he began publishing the Vallejo Evening-Chronicle.  He married Mary Louise Powell in Vallejo in December 1870.  He published the Evening-Standard until 1886, when he moved to Oakland, California and founded the Oakland Enquirer.

Leach retired from journalism in 1897 to become Superintendent of the San Francisco Mint.  In 1907, on the recommendation of United States Secretary of the Treasury George B. Cortelyou, President of the United States Theodore Roosevelt named Leach Director of the United States Mint and Leach held that office from September 1907 until August 1909.

Frank Leach died on June 19, 1929.  He is buried at Mountain View Cemetery (Oakland, California), plot 14B.

Works

References

1846 births
1929 deaths
Directors of the United States Mint
Theodore Roosevelt administration personnel
Taft administration personnel